And Their Children After Them (French: Leurs enfants après eux, literal translation Their Children After Them) is a 2018 novel by French writer Nicolas Mathieu. Actes Sud published the novel, Mathieu's second. An English translation by William Rodarmor was published by Hodder & Stoughton and Other Press in April 2020. The novel portrays the lives of teenagers and adolescents in peri-urban areas of eastern France in the 1990s, and deals with the consequences of deindustrialization.

The novel received positive reviews from the literary press. It received the Prix Goncourt on November 7, 2018. In November 2021, the English translation won the Albertine Prize, a readers' choice prize administered by the French embassy in New York.


Writing and development
Mathieu explored deindustrialization in the east of France in his first book, the hardboiled novel Aux animaux la guerre, published by Actes Sud through their “Actes Noir” imprint. Mathieu chose to engage further with this topic for his second novel, although focusing on children born near the end of the 1970s, who were teenagers in the 1990s. Beyond his experience writing about the topic of deindustrialization in his first novel and his desire to explore it further, Mathieu was prodded to write the book by the 2013 movie Mud. In particular, the author cites the opening scene, which features two adolescents, as inspirational.
Mathieu sought to anchor his writing in real "society and politics". This desire reflects the goals of 19th-century French writers, such as Honoré de Balzac and Émile Zola, as well as contemporary authors, including Annie Ernaux.

Reception

Comparisons to other works
Critics have compared Mathieu's work to that of others engaging with post-industrial themes and the working class, including Didier Eribon and Édouard Louis.

References

2018 French novels
Novels set in France
Prix Goncourt winning works
Actes Sud books
Novels set in the 1990s
Fiction set in 1992
Fiction set in 1994
Fiction set in 1996
Fiction set in 1998
Hodder & Stoughton books
Other Press books